Agron (fl. c.1192 BC) was a legendary king of Lydia who is named by Herodotus as the first of the Lydian Heraclid dynasty. Before he assumed the throne, the ruling family had been the Maeonian line of Lydus, from whom the country's name was derived. According to Herodotus, the Heraclid dynasty in Lydia reigned continuously through 22 generations for 505 years. The last of the line was Candaules, whose date of death was c.687 BC, so Herodotus' computation suggests c.1192 BC for Agron's accession.

See also
 List of kings of Lydia

Notes

Sources
 
 

Kings of Lydia
12th-century BC rulers